Marianne Maximi (born 13 November 1985) is a French politician of the La France Insoumise. She was elected as the deputy in the National Assembly for Puy-de-Dôme's 1st constituency in 2022.

References

See also 

 List of deputies of the 16th National Assembly of France

Living people
1985 births
La France Insoumise politicians
21st-century French politicians
21st-century French women politicians
Women members of the National Assembly (France)
Deputies of the 16th National Assembly of the French Fifth Republic
People from Louviers